Fear of a Brown Planet are an Australian stand-up comedy duo consisting of Aamer Rahman and Nazeem Hussain.

History

Fear of a Brown Planet first run (2004–2008)
In 2004, Aamer Rahman and Nazeem Hussain met at an Islamic awards function, as a result of their support for asylum seekers and for anti-racism activism. They became friends and did youth work together in Melbourne.

In 2007, Hussain entered Triple J's Raw Comedy Award open mic competition at the Melbourne Comedy Festival After seeing Hussain compete, Rahman also decided to enter. They beat hundreds of other hopefuls to reach the Victorian State final together. Hussain reached the Victorian final. Rahman won the State Final and went onto the national finals where he was voted the runner-up in a performance that was screened on ABC Television.

Due to the success of Raw Comedy they decided to develop their five-minute stand-up routines into a one-hour show together. In five years, they established their own stage show Fear of a Brown Planet and sold out around Australia. Their name plays on the Public Enemy LP, Fear of a Black Planet.

Rahman and Hussain performed their first show in 2007 and their second show in 2008. They were then given a network development deal for a year and a half.

In the same year, they performed Fear of a Brown Planet at the Melbourne International Comedy Festival, Sydney Comedy Festival, and the Adelaide Fringe. In April 2008, Rahman and Hussain first performed Fear of a Brown Planet at Melbourne Fringe Festival.

In 2009, Hussain and Rahman were among ten writers selected for an exclusive script-writing workshop hosted by UK indie film company Warp X, Screen Australia and Madman Entertainment.

Fear of a Brown Planet Returns (2010–present)
In 2010, Rahman and Hussain performed their follow up show, Fear of a Brown Planet Returns at the Melbourne International Comedy Festival, Sydney Comedy Festival, and the Adelaide Fringe. In the same year, Aamer performed in the Oxfam Comedy Gala televised on Channel Ten, whilst Nazeem performed in the Cracker Night of the Sydney Comedy Festival Gala, televised on The Comedy Channel. In October 2010, took part in a one-off concert with Azhar Usman, Preacher Moss and Mo Amer (Allah Made Me Funny) at the Athenaeum Theatre in Paris.

In August 2011, they performed at the Edinburgh Fringe Festival. On the way home from Edinburgh they performed an impromptu show in London, after a friend of theirs organised a show in Brixton with two days notice.

In 2011, Australian Story broadcast a documentary on the ABC about Rahman's and Hussain's lives in Australia as well as their debut performances in Edinburgh and London. In the same year, they performed their new show, Fear of a Brown Planet Attacks. On 30 August 2011, Fear of a Brown Planet Returns DVD and Blu-ray was released, which was recorded at the Chapel Off Chapel in Melbourne on 15 January 2011. It features the "best of" material from their 2010 sell-out festival show, also entitled Fear of a Brown Planet Returns, as well as content from their debut shows. In December 2011 and December 2012, they performed on ABC2.

In April 2012, Rahman and Hussain played at the second show of the Melbourne Comedy Festival. In September 2012, they toured the United Kingdom, where they performed in cities including Manchester, Bradford, London, Birmingham and Cardiff.

In 2013, they performed at Darwin, Sydney, Brisbane and Melbourne. In October 2013, they performed at the Sydney Opera House.

Comedy style and reception
Rahman and Hussain write together and perform as a tag-team. Their show splits into two sets, each performing alone before handing over to the other.

Each is introduced by a video-montage poking mild fun at political idiocies. Their style is orthodox standup, distinguished by the quality and novelty of the material. Rahman is cheerful and upbeat while Hussain is sly, laconic and wry sardonic. Hussain is energetic, using an assortment of accents and playful movements whilst Rahman proves black comedy delivered when standing still can be effective.

Majority of Rahman's material are things that have happened to him and about the community. Hussain's jokes are about himself, his family and his community.

Reviews
"Self deprecating and thought provoking."  – The Big Issue
"The punchlines are razor sharp."  – The British Comedy Guide
"Easy charm, subversive spirit - and a cool confidence."  – The Guardian
"This is bold comedy with an unbelievably powerful message, and totally unmissable." – Beat Magazine

Awards
In 2008, Rahman and Hussain were recipients of the Melbourne International Comedy Festival Best Newcomer Award for their debut show Fear of a Brown Planet.

See also
Islam in Australia
Islamic humour
Allah Made Me Funny

References

External links

Nazeem Hussain and Aamer Rahman's comedy. Immigration Museum
Carbone, Suzanne. Ziffer, Daniel. Pete didn't find this joker funny. The Age. 22 October 2007
Cassandra. Who is ignorant?. Australian Islamist Monitor. 16 March 2011
Richards, Tim. Fear of a Brown Planet Attacks. The Age. 13 April 2011
Vranjes, Emilia.  Muslims in the mainstream. inMyCommunity. 13 July 2011
The Planet They're On - Transcript. ABC Online. 7 November 2011

Logan, Brian. Fear of a Brown Planet – review. The Guardian. 16 November 2011
Ritchie, Ruth. Crossing the racial divide. The Sydney Morning Herald. 26 November 2011
Hook, Chris. Fear of a Brown Planet to perform at Sydney's Comedy Store in January. The Daily Telegraph. 28 December 2011
Hamilton, Davina. 'Is Australia racist? In a word, yes'. The Voice Online. 19 September 2012
Hajaj, Nidal. Elliott-Cooper, Adam.  Interview: Fear of a Brown Planet (Video) . Ceasefire Magazine. 24 September 2012
Interview with Hussain and Rahman, from 'Fear of a Brown Planet'. Australian Times. 11 October 2012
Fear of a Brown Planet – review. London is Funny. 20 September 2012

2007 establishments in Australia
Australian comedy duos
Australian male comedians
Australian stand-up comedians